Ayutla de los Libres (Mixtec: Tatioo) is a city and seat of the municipality of Ayutla de los Libres, in the state of Guerrero, southern Mexico. As of 2010, its population was 15,370. The city of Ayulta de los Libres is the most populous in its municipality and accounts for about a quarter of the municipality's population.

The Plan of Ayutla was proclaimed here on 1 March 1854.

Name
The name "Ayutla" comes from Nahuatl Ayotlan meaning "near the (place of abundance of) tortoises/turtles".  The sobriquet "de los Libres" ("of the Free") was added after 1854, because the town was the place where the Ayutla Revolution started on March 1, 1854, and where the Ayutla Plan was announced.

References

Populated places in Guerrero